Vahvajärvi is a lake in Hirvensalmi, Finland. It is a medium-sized lake in the Kymijoki main catchment area. It is located in the region of Southern Savonia. The length of the lake is about ten kilometers.

The lake gets its water through the Kissakoski canal from the lake Liekune, which is a part of a larger lake complex, Puula. When the canal was dug, the water level in Vahvajärvi rose several feet. The water then runs to Ripatinkoski (Ripatti Rapids), a one-mile stream between Vahvajärvi and Iso-Sämpiä.

See also
List of lakes in Finland

References

Lakes of Hirvensalmi